Active Citizens was a left-wing political party in Greece. It was founded by the late Manolis Glezos, former United Democratic Left member of the Hellenic Parliament, in 2002 and joined the Coalition of the Radical Left (SYRIZA) in 2004, where it has largely remained other than a brief stint with the Popular Unity party during the September 2015 legislative elections.

References

2002 establishments in Greece
2002 in Greek politics
Components of Syriza
Defunct socialist parties in Greece
Political parties established in 2002